Nandalal Bose (3 December 1882 – 16 April 1966) was one of the pioneers of modern Indian art and a key figure of Contextual Modernism.

A pupil of Abanindranath Tagore, Bose was known for his "Indian style" of painting. He became the principal of Kala Bhavan, Santiniketan in 1921. He was influenced by the Tagore family and the murals of Ajanta; his classic works include paintings of scenes from Indian mythologies, women, and village life.

Today, many critics consider his paintings among India's most important modern paintings. In 1976, the Archaeological Survey of India, Department of Culture, Govt. of India declared his works among the "nine artists" whose work, "not being antiquities", were to be henceforth considered "to be art treasures, having regard to their artistic and aesthetic value".

He was given the work of illustrating the constitution of India.

Early life

Nandalal Bose was born on 3 December 1882 in a middle-class Bengali family at Haveli Kharagpur, in Munger district of Bihar state. The family originally hailed from Jejur, Hooghly District of West Bengal. His father, Purna Chandra Bose, was at that time working in the Darbhanga Estate. His mother Khetramoni Devi was a housewife with a skill in improvising toys and dolls for young Nandalal. From his early days Nandalal began taking an interest in modelling images and later, decorating Puja pandals.

In 1898, at the age of fifteen, Nandalal moved to Calcutta for his high school studies in the Central Collegiate School. After clearing his examinations in 1902, he continued his college studies at the same institution. In June 1903 he married Sudhiradevi, the daughter of a family friend. Nanadalal wanted to study art, but he was not given permission by his family. Unable to qualify for promotion in his classes, Nandalal moved to other colleges, joining the Presidency College in 1905 to study commerce. After repeated failures, he persuaded his family to let him study art at Calcutta's School of Art.

Career

As a young artist, Nandalal Bose was deeply influenced by the murals of the Ajanta Caves. He had become part of an international circle of artists and writers seeking to revive classical Indian culture; a circle that already included Okakura Kakuzō, William Rothenstein, Yokoyama Taikan, Christiana Herringham, Laurence Binyon, Abanindranath Tagore, and the seminal London Modernist sculptors Eric Gill and Jacob Epstein.

To mark the 1930 occasion of Mahatma Gandhi's arrest for protesting the British tax on salt, Bose created a black on white linocut print of Gandhi walking with a staff. It became the iconic image for the non-violence movement.

His genius and original style were recognised by famous artists and art critics like Gaganendranath Tagore, Ananda Coomaraswamy and O. C. Ganguli. These lovers of art felt that objective criticism was necessary for the development of painting and founded the Indian Society of Oriental Art.

He became principal of the Kala Bhavana (College of Arts) at Tagore's International University Santiniketan in 1921.

He was also famously asked by Jawaharlal Nehru to sketch the emblems for the Government of India's awards, including the Bharat Ratna and the Padma Shri. Along with his disciple Rammanohar, Nandalal Bose took up the historic task of beautifying/decorating the original manuscript of the Constitution of India.

He died on 16 April 1966 in Santiniketan of natural causes.

Today, the National Gallery of Modern Art in Delhi holds 7000 of his works in its collection, including a 1930 black and white linocut of the Dandi March depicting Mahatma Gandhi, and a set of seven posters he later made at the request of Mahatma Gandhi for the 1938 Haripura Session of the Indian National Congress.

His place in Indian Art

In his introduction for the Christie's catalogue, R. Siva Kumar wrote-

Students
Some of his notable students were Benode Behari Mukherjee, Ramkinkar Baij, Beohar Rammanohar Sinha, K. G. Subramanyan, A. Ramachandran, Pratima Thakur, Jahar Dasgupta, Satyajit Ray, Dinkar Kaushik, and Amritlal Vegad.

Also, A.D.Jayathilake, a student from Ceylon (Sri Lanka), had the opportunity to study under Dr. Nandalal Bose from 1948–1952.

Honours and awards

Nandalal Bose, who left a major imprint on Indian art, was the first recipient of a scholarship offered by the Indian Society of Oriental Art, founded in 1907.

In 1954, he became the first artist to be elected Fellow of the Lalit Kala Akademi, India's National Academy of Art. In 1954, Nandalal Bose was awarded the Padma Vibhushan.

In 1957, the University of Calcutta conferred honorary D.Litt. on him. Vishvabharati University honoured him by conferring on him the title of 'Deshikottama'.

The Academy of Fine Arts in Calcutta honoured Nandalal with the Silver Jubilee Medal. The Tagore Birth Centenary Medal was awarded to Nandalal Bose in 1965 by the Asiatic Society of Bengal.

Acharya Nandalal, an Indian documentary film on the artist was made by Harisadhan Dasgupta in 1984.

Publications 

 Drishti o srishti[Vision and the Creation] By Nandalal Bose, Published by Visva-Bharati Granthana Vibhaga [ Edition Language - Bengali ]
 Shilpa Charcha[ শিল্প চর্চা ] by Nandalal Bose, Published April 1956 by Visva Bharati [ Edition Language - Bengali ]
 Pictures from the life of buddha By Nandalal Bose
 Rupavali by Nandalal Bose

References

Further reading
 Nandalal Bose and Indian painting, by Ramyansu Sekhar Das. Tower Publishers, 1958.
 Bharat Shilpi Nandalal, Volumes 1-4, (in Bengali) by Panchanan Mandal, Rarh Gobeshona Parshad, Santiniketan, 1968
 Nandalal Bose: a collection of essays : centenary volume. Lalit Kala Akademi, 1983.
 Nandalal Bose, the doyen of Indian art. (National biography), by Dinkar Kowshik. National Book Trust, India, 1985.
 Rhythms of India: The Art of Nandalal Bose, exhibition catalogue. Sonya Rhie Quintanilla. San Diego Museum of Art. 2008.

External links
 New York Times slideshow

Indian male painters
Fellows of the Lalit Kala Akademi
Recipients of the Padma Vibhushan in arts
People from Howrah district
1880s births
1966 deaths
Government College of Art & Craft alumni
University of Calcutta alumni
Academic staff of Visva-Bharati University
Bengali Hindus
Bengali male artists
20th-century Bengalis
Indian art educators
Indian arts administrators
People from Munger district
20th-century Indian painters
20th-century Indian educators
Educators from West Bengal
People from Birbhum district
People from Kolkata
Artists from Kolkata
Painters from West Bengal